The Last Gospel (titled The Lost Tomb in the US) is an archaeological adventure novel by David Gibbins. First published in 2008, it is the third book in Gibbins' Jack Howard series. It has been published in more than 20 languages and was a London Sunday Times top-ten bestseller  and a New York Times top-ten bestseller .

Other language editions
Among its international editions The Last Gospel is titled Le Dernier Evangile in France and Il Vangelo proibito in Italy .

Plot summary
1st century CE: the lame Claudius, not yet Emperor of Rome, travels in the year 23 to Galilee where he meets a charismatic young carpenter, Joshua of Nazareth, and is inspired by his philosophy of heaven on earth. Claudius records the carpenter’s words on a scroll that he takes back to Rome. Later, after the Nazarene is crucified, Claudius becomes emperor. He fakes his own death and disappears from imperial Rome to contrive an ingenuous plan to hide this secret gospel of Christ from those who would destroy it. 21st century: archaeologist Jack Howard and his team of researchers first learn of this last gospel when excavating Claudius’s secret library near Pompeii. Following the trail of clues Claudius has laid out, their quest takes them from Italy to London, California, and finally Jerusalem. All the while the mafia and elite Vatican henchmen are hot on their heels, willing to stop at nothing to prevent Christ’s true message from being discovered. Eventually they find the Gospel of Jesus. In the epilogue the whole scene of Claudius meeting Jesus is shown. The words of the Gospel are: " The Kingdom of heaven is on Earth. No one shall stand in the way of the word of God. There shall be no Priests. And there shall be no Temples."

External links
 David Gibbins' website

2008 British novels
British adventure novels
British thriller novels
Archaeology in popular culture
Headline Publishing Group books